The Mourne Wall was constructed to enclose a catchment area of the Silent Valley Reservoir in the Mourne Mountains, Northern Ireland. The project was overseen by the Belfast City and District Water Commissioners.

History

Planning
Luke Livingstone Macassey (1843–1908), an Irish civil engineer and barrister, was in 1874 appointed consultant hydraulic engineer by the Belfast and District Water Commissioners. The Commission had been set up in 1840 to ensure the water supply for Belfast, at that time an expanding city. In 1891 Macassey advised the construction of a reservoir in the Mourne Mountains, as a long-term solution.

The project required the acquisition of wayleaves and water rights. Private Acts of Parliament were passed, of 1893, 1897 and 1899, on behalf of the Commissioners.

The Silent Valley Reservoir was built between 1923 and 1933 to hold the water from the catchment area enclosed by the wall. The reservoir supplies Belfast via the Mourne Conduit/Aquarius pipeline. The main purpose of the Mourne Wall was to isolate the catchment area from cattle and sheep.

Construction

The wall was crafted from natural granite stone using traditional dry stone walling techniques.

Topography
As the wall was built to contain the catchment area of the Mourne, the wall passes over fifteen of the highest mountains in the area (listed clockwise from the Kilkeel River):
Slievenaglogh 
Slieve Muck 
Carn Mountain 
Slieve Loughshannagh 
Slieve Meelbeg 
Slieve Meelmore 
Slieve Bearnagh 
Slievenaglogh 
Slieve Corragh 
Slieve Commedagh 
Slieve Donard 
Rocky Mountain 
Slieve Binnian 
Wee Binnian 
Moolieve

Management
The wall is maintained and owned by Northern Ireland Water.

Hiking 
The Mourne Wall Challenge Walk is a challenging walking route following the historic Mourne Wall over seven of the ten highest mountains in Northern Ireland. In 2013, an event's designated route was recorded by a participant as being  with a total  elevation. Although the designated route of this event contained two significant diversions from the wall itself in the Silent Valley and Annalong Valley.

Different versions of Mourne Wall challenge routes have been posted on the internet in recent years. The first of these follows the entire length of the wall as a full circuit of the mountain land owned by Northern Ireland Water (including Silent Valley Mountain Park). A second version follows the perimeter of the rainfall catchment area only, cutting across the dam wall of the Silent Valley reservoir. A third version of the route was specified for an organised walking event in 2013. This version also appears in Paddy Dillon's guidebook 'The Mournes Walks'.

Citations
References

Further reading

External links 

Photos, maps and commentary of the walk around the Wall
Photos from Annadale Mountaineering Club trips to the Mournes including the Wall
The Classic Walks of Ireland - The Mourne Wall. An account of a walk of the Mourne Wall

Mountains and hills of County Down
Walls in Northern Ireland
Buildings and structures in County Down
Belfast City and District Water Commissioners